Peter II, Duke of Bourbon (1 December 1438 – 10 October 1503 in Moulins), was the son of Charles I, Duke of Bourbon, and Agnes of Burgundy, and a member of the House of Bourbon. He and his wife Anne of France ruled as regents during the minority of Charles VIII of France.

Life, marriage, and royal favour
A loyal and capable subject of the crown, Peter earned the grudging respect of Louis XI through his demonstration of the Bourbon family's "meekness and humility". Initially he was betrothed to Marie d'Orleans, sister of Louis, Duke of Orleans (the future Louis XII); Louis XI, who wanted to prevent such an alliance between two of the greatest feudal houses in France, broke the engagement, and took measures to bind both families closer to the crown.

A marriage between Peter and the King's elder daughter, Anne, was arranged (as was another marriage between Louis of Orleans and Anne's younger sister, Joan); as a mark of his favour, the King forced Peter's older brother John II, Duke of Bourbon to grant the Bourbon fief of Beaujeu (Beaujolais) to Peter, who was also given a seat on the royal council. Peter and Anne were married on 3 November 1473.

Regent of France and Duke of Bourbon

At the time of Louis XI's death in 1483, Peter was one of the few royal servants to have remained consistently in favour during the King's reign, and it was to him that Louis, on his deathbed, granted guardianship over the new King, Charles VIII. Peter and his wife Anne immediately took up their duties, and began to position themselves as leaders of a regency government. The King was swiftly crowned, preventing the need for a regency government; instead, the thirteen-year-old King undertook personal rule of the Kingdom—theoretically on his own, but in reality guided by the Beaujeu couple.

Having assisted his wife in the governing of France, in 1488 both were able to begin building up a power-base of their own in the Bourbonnais. Anne was already Countess of Gien, and Peter was Count of Clermont and La Marche, as well as Lord of Beaujeu; but the death of his eldest brother, John II, and the subsequent enforced renunciation of the family rights by his next eldest brother, Charles II, delivered the Bourbon inheritance (the Duchies of Bourbon and Auvergne, and the Counties of Forez and l'Isle-en-Jordain) into Peter's hands.

The new Duke and Duchess of Bourbon then proceeded to add to these domains, adding Bourbon-Lancy in December 1488, and trading l'Isle-en-Jordain with the Armagnacs in June 1489 for Carlades and Murat. These domains were granted to them by the King in absolute right – they would not revert to the crown, and were not obligated to pass to the next heirs to the Bourbon inheritance, the Bourbon-Montpensiers – the Duke and Duchess could bequeath them to whomsoever they wished. On 10 May 1491, the pair finally acquired an heir of their own, a daughter, Suzanne (Anne had an earlier pregnancy in 1476, but about this existed contradictory accounts: some say the baby was miscarried or been stillborn, but others reported that a living son was born, Charles, styled Count of Clermont in 1488 as was customary for the heir of the Duchy of Bourbon, who died aged 22 in 1498 and was buried in the Abbey of Souvigny, Auvergne).

By 1491, the Bourbon influence over the crown was waning; Charles VIII was an adult now, unwilling to accept tutelage from his family. Against the better judgement of Anne and Peter, Charles chose to renounce his unconsummated marriage to Margaret of Austria, and instead marry Anne, Duchess of Brittany; he then went against them by returning Margaret's dowry – Artois and Franche-Comté – to her brother, Philip the Handsome. Nor were either able to prevent Charles' disastrous Italian expeditions, although both were left in control of France on several of his absences. Both continued to be major figures in the court for the rest of Charles VIII's reign, but restricted in power. After Charles VIII's death, and the accession of Louis XII, Peter largely retired from court politics and devoted his few remaining years to his family, being particularly devoted to his daughter Suzanne.

Succession to the Duchy of Bourbon
Without surviving male issue, the next heir to the Bourbon Duchy was Suzanne. It was in the question of the future of Suzanne and the Bourbon territories that Peter and Anne found themselves opposing each another in his final years. With Charles VIII dead and the more cautious Louis XII on the throne, Suzanne needed a husband to support her in her inheritance, which risked being disputed by the crown and the Montpensiers. The Duke and Duchess had initially groomed the next Bourbon heir, Louis of Bourbon-Montpensier, as a son-in-law; but he mortally offended Peter by condemning letters patent of Louis XII which confirmed Suzanne's rights of inheritance (having been wrung from him as the price of Bourbon support upon his accession).

Peter then decided to betroth Suzanne to Charles IV, Duke of Alençon, a favourite of Louis XII, and so likely to protect the duchy against royal encroachment and Montpensier challenges. This contract was signed on 21 March 1501 at Moulins, Charles being 11, Suzanne 9. Before this marriage could be completed, however, Peter died of a fever. Following this, Anne arranged for Suzanne to marry the next Bourbon heir-male, Charles of Bourbon-Montpensier (Louis of Bourbon-Montpensier having died the year before), thereby averting a succession dispute over the Bourbon inheritance, which the young pair inherited jointly.

Family tree

References

| style="width:30%; text-align:center;"| Preceded by:—
| style="width:40%; text-align:center;"| Count of La Marche 1477–1503
| style="width:30%; text-align:center;" rowspan="3"| Succeeded by:Suzanne and Charles III
|-
| style="width:30%; text-align:center;"| Preceded by:John II
| style="width:40%; text-align:center;"| Lord of Beaujeu and Count of Clermont-en-Beauvaisis1476–1503
|-
| style="width:30%; text-align:center;" rowspan="2"| Preceded by:Charles II
| style="width:40%; text-align:center;"| Duke of Auvergne and BourbonCount of Forez1488–1503
|-
| style="width:40%; text-align:center;"| Count of l'Isle-Jourdain1488–1489
| style="width:30%; text-align:center;"| Succeeded by:John of Armagnac

1438 births
1503 deaths
House of Bourbon (France)
Dukes of Bourbon
Dukes of Auvergne
Counts of Forez
Counts of La Marche
Counts of Gien
Counts of Clermont-en-Beauvaisis
Regents of France
Burials at Souvigny Priory
15th-century peers of France
16th-century peers of France